The tidinet is a type of string instrument from Mauritania and other regions in North Africa. It is most often only played by men. The tidinet resembles a small guitar and is used by griots.

References 

String instruments
Mauritanian musical instruments